Chen Weiqiang (Chinese: 陈伟强; born 1958 in Dongguan, Guangdong) is a male Chinese weightlifter. He began training in a sports school in the provincial Gymnasium in 1972. Two years later, he joined the provincial team. He won a gold medal at 1984 Los Angeles.

References
 

1958 births
Living people
Chinese male weightlifters
Olympic weightlifters of China
Weightlifters at the 1984 Summer Olympics
Olympic gold medalists for China
Olympic medalists in weightlifting
Medalists at the 1984 Summer Olympics
Asian Games medalists in weightlifting
People from Dongguan
Weightlifters at the 1982 Asian Games
Weightlifters from Guangdong
Asian Games gold medalists for China
Medalists at the 1982 Asian Games
20th-century Chinese people
21st-century Chinese people